The Bittern Line is a railway branch line in Norfolk, England, that links  to . It passes through the Broads on its route to an Area of Outstanding Natural Beauty on the north Norfolk coast. It is named after the bittern, a rare bird found in the reedy wetlands of Norfolk.

It is part of Network Rail Strategic Route 7, SRS 07.11, and is classified as a rural line.

Passenger services are operated by Greater Anglia, which also manages all of the stations.

History
From the early twentieth century until the end of steam services, in 1962, the Great Eastern Railway operated coastal holiday services from London Liverpool Street under names such as the Norfolk Coast Express and The Broadsman.

Following the closure of the majority of the Midland and Great Northern network, the line operated as a single branch between Norwich and Melton Constable before the section between Sheringham and Melton Constable was closed in 1964.  The remainder of the line was listed for closure in 1967 but survived the proposal after being declined by the Secretary of State for Transport. 

The Bittern Line Partnership was set up by Norfolk County Council in 1997. and was designated a community rail line by the Department for Transport in September 2007.

The section of the line between Sheringham and Holt which was closed in the 1960s remains in use as a heritage railway line operated as the North Norfolk Railway. After a period of 36 years, the link between the Bittern line and the North Norfolk Railway was reinstated in 2010 with the opening of a new level crossing at Sheringham.

Stations

Services

Passenger services are operated by Greater Anglia. The typical service is one train per hour in each direction between Norwich and Sheringham.

In 2019, new Class 755 bi-mode trains began to replace the previous mixture of Class 153, Class 156 and Class 170 diesel multiple units.

The line is also used by freight trains which are operated by GB Railfreight. Some trains carry gas condensate from a terminal at North Walsham to Harwich International Port.

Infrastructure

The line is not electrified; it has a loading gauge of W8 between Norwich and Roughton Road and W6 from Roughton Road to Sheringham.

The line was re-signalled in 2000, leading to the closure of a number of mechanical signal boxes and control moving to a panel at the Trowse Swing Bridge control room. This saw the end of one of the few remaining sections of single-track main line controlled by tokens. The Cromer signal box has been preserved.

Proposed developments

Rackheath station
A new station is proposed as part of the Rackheath eco-town. The building of the town may also mean a short freight spur being built to transport fuel to fire an on-site power station. The plans for the settlement received approval from the government in 2009.

References

External links

The Bittern Line website by Greater Anglia
The route of the line

Rail transport in Norfolk
Railway lines in the East of England
Community railway lines in England
North Norfolk
Railway lines opened in 1887
Standard gauge railways in England